"I Can't Feel You" is German synthpop group Camouflage's seventeenth single, released in August 2003 via the Polydor label as the second and final single from their sixth studio album Sensor.

As with the previous single "Me and You", "I Can't Feel You" was released with a remix CD in Europe.

Track listings
CD single (Europe, 2003)
 "I Can't Feel You" (radio edit) – 3:48
 "I Can't Feel You" (extended version) – 5:19
 "I Can't Feel You" (Mellow Trax Short Full Vocal Club remix) – 3:59
 "Telephone Sensor" – 4:17

Remix CD single (Europe, 2003)
 "I Can't Feel You" (Mesh remix) – 6:59
 "I Can't Feel You" (Mellow Trax Full Vocal remix) – 7:47
 "I Can't Feel You" (Mellow Trax Club remix) – 6:03

12" single (Europe, 2003)
 "I Can't Feel You" (Mellow Trax Club remix) – 6:03
 "I Can't Feel You" (extended version) – 5:19
 "I Can't Feel You" (Mellow Trax Full Vocal remix) – 7:47
 "Telephone Sensor" – 4:17

CD single (Germany, 2003)
 "I Can't Feel You" (radio edit) – 3:48

Credits
Credits for the European edition:
Artwork – www.feedbackmedia.de 
Co-producer – Heiko Maile (tracks: 1 to 3) 
Guitar – Jörn Heilbutt (tracks: 1 to 3) 
Mastered By – Miles Showell (tracks: 1 to 3) 
Mixed By – Humate (tracks: 1 to 3) 
Mixed By [Mixing Assistant] – Arne Schuhmann (tracks: 1 to 3), Jonas Zadow (tracks: 1 to 3) 
Performer – Heiko Maile, Marcus Meyn, Oliver Kreyssig 
Photography By – Mathias Bothor 
Producer – Humate (tracks: 1 to 3) 
Producer [Additional], Programmed By [Additional] – Andre Winter (tracks: 1 to 3) 
Written-By – Christoph Papendieck (tracks: 1 to 3), Gerret Frerichs (tracks: 1 to 3), Kim Sanders (tracks: 1 to 3), Sven Schumacher (tracks: 1 to 3)

References

External links
Camouflage > I Can't Feel You

2003 singles
Camouflage (band) songs
2003 songs
Polydor Records singles